Humphrey Owen (1702 – 26 March 1768) was the Principal of Jesus College, Oxford, from 1763 to his death.

Owen studied at Jesus College from 1718 to 1722 and was elected as a Fellow in 1725.  He was Rector of Tredington 1744–63.  In 1747 he was appointed Bodley's Librarian, and continued to hold this post when appointed Principal in 1763. In that same year, he was awarded his D.D. and was appointed to the parish of Rotherfield Peppard. He died in 1768 and was buried in the college chapel.

References

1702 births
1768 deaths
Alumni of Jesus College, Oxford
Fellows of Jesus College, Oxford
Bodley's Librarians
Welsh librarians
18th-century Welsh Anglican priests
Principals of Jesus College, Oxford